Siri Graff Leknes is a Norwegian neuroscientist and Professor (Chair) of Neuroscience at the University of Oslo, where she directs the Leknes Affective Brain Lab, which is funded by a European Research Council grant.

She earned her Ph.D. in neuroscience at the University of Oxford in 2008 with the dissertation Pain, Pleasure and Relief. After postdoctoral fellowships in Gothenburg and Oslo, she joined Oslo University Hospital as a senior researcher. In 2014 she was appointed full Professor of Neuroscience at the University of Oslo.

According to Google Scholar, she has been cited over 2,000 times in scientific literature.

References

Norwegian psychologists
Norwegian women psychologists
Norwegian neuroscientists
Academic staff of the University of Oslo
Norwegian women neuroscientists
21st-century Norwegian scientists
21st-century women scientists
Living people
Norwegian expatriates in England
Norwegian expatriates in Sweden
Year of birth missing (living people)